LGA 771, also known as Socket J, is a CPU interface introduced by Intel in 2006. It is used in Intel Core microarchitecture and NetBurst microarchitecture(Dempsey) based DP-capable server processors, the Dual-Core Xeon is codenamed Dempsey, Woodcrest, and Wolfdale and the Quad-Core processors Clovertown, Harpertown, and Yorkfield-CL. It is also used for the Core 2 Extreme QX9775, and blade servers designated under Conroe-CL.

It was succeeded by LGA 1366 for the Nehalem-based Xeon processors.

Technical specifications

As its name implies, it is a land grid array with 771 contacts. The word "socket" in this instance is a misnomer, as the processor interface has no pin holes. Instead, it has 771 protruding lands which touch contact points on the underside of the microprocessor.

The "J" in "Socket J" refers to the now-canceled processor codenamed "Jayhawk", which was expected to debut alongside this interface. It is intended as a successor to Socket 604 and takes much of its design from LGA 775 and is almost pin compatible with LGA 775. 

Socket 771 CPUs are rotated 90 degrees and have two pins swapped. Small adapters developed by Chinese computer DIY enthusiasts are available to allow LGA 771 CPUs to be installed in LGA 775 motherboards, if the BIOS microcode supports them (but it is also possible to add supporting microcode manually). This also allows for overclocking of Xeon (socket 771) processors when used in the correct (socket 775) motherboards. Some overclockers have managed quite substantial overclocks such as 4.023GHz on a Xeon X5492 for a total overclock of just over 18%.

Single core processors

Dual core processors 

 Hyperthreading supported only on 50xx series processors(codenamed Dempsey)

Quad core processors

See also 
 List of Intel microprocessors
 List of Intel Xeon microprocessors

References

Intel CPU sockets